Mukui is a settlement in Kenya's Central Province.  It is in the Nyeri region.

References 

Populated places in Central Province (Kenya)